mu Space and Advanced Technology Co., Ltd., operating under the name mu Space Corp, is an aerospace manufacturer and satellite internet service provider in Southeast Asia and was founded by James Yenbamroong in 2017.

History 
In December 2017, 7 months after the initial founding of mu Space Corp, Thailand's National Broadcasting and Telecommunications Commission granted mu Space Corp a 15-year license to provide satellite services in the country until 2032. 

Initially focused on the implementation of a nationwide broadband project using satellite technology, mu Space began conducting space-related research in 2018. In July 2018, the company sent micro-gravity experiments into space aboard the Blue Origin New Shepard rocket, and in September 2018 released a 3D rendering of their own spacesuit version for use by astronauts and space tourists. The company has signed satellite launch contracts with Blue Origin, using the New Glenn rocket, and with Relativity Space using Terran 1, the world's first 3D-printed rocket.

The company signed an MoU Agreement with TOT Public Company Limited (TOT) to engage in the space industry and 5G telecoms services in September 2020 and sent an extra enormous payload in October 2020 for Space IDC project by Blue Origin's New Shepard Suborbital which incorporates a wide scope of electronic devices, and sensors for the estimation. The company launched a soft opening for its Future Factory (Factory 0) on 26 December 2020 for manufacturing and testing satellite prototypes.

In February 2021, mu Space signed an MoU with Airbus Defense and Space, the world's leading company in spaceship manufacturing. The collaboration between mu Space and Airbus focuses on cooperation on spacecraft and space technology in Thailand emphasizing several areas including Earth-observation, Space Situational Awareness (SSA), Low Earth Orbit (LEO) satellite constellations, Planetary missions, and Global Navigation Satellite System (GNSS). mu Space started to expand its manufacturing site to a larger factory (Factory 01) in early 2021.

Facilities 
mu Space's office is currently based in Bangkok, Krung Thep, Thailand. 

In December 2020, mu Space built a 200 square-meter factory, named Factory 0, to support the production capacity of developing, testing and manufacturing their prototypes, featuring a 3D printer, a clean room and advanced material facilities.

In April 2021, mu Space established a factory 10 times larger than Factory 0 to develop, test, and manufacture satellite parts and power systems for use in-house and for potential space customers. This factory, named Factory 1, features a power system with a chemical laboratory, office robotics, clean room and workshop areas.

In early October 2021, mu Space unveiled Factory 2 which can house significantly more production than Factory 0 and 1. Factory 2's purpose is to scale up its production, expand its workforce and focus production on various space components. Factory 2 has similar facilities to the older factories, featuring chemical laboratories, an electronic laboratory and various other important facilities.

Technology

Satellite 
The National Broadcasting and Telecommunications Communication had awarded mu Space a license to provide satellite services to Thailand until 2032. In 2018, mu Space started to install equipment to deliver the satellite broadband service for government projects with the plan to use satellites of another company, SES.

The company's "Space IDC" (Space Internet Data Center) is a joint project between mu Space Corp and a Thai state-owned telecommunications company, and aims to provide a data center service with a server, both located in outer space.

mu Space will also launch its first geostationary satellites with Blue Origin with a target date of 2021 in order to help provide space-based satellite broadband, broadcast, mobile and satellite services to Thailand.

Space Payload Launch

Blue Origin New Shepard Launch Vehicle 
In July 2018, mu Space sent an experimental payload into space aboard Blue Origin's New Shepard space rocket to test how materials react in micro-gravity environment. mu Space had successfully sent payload to the boundary of space 4 times with the intention of raising public awareness, in the micro-gravity stages with Blue Origin New Shepard flight spanning three years from 2018-2020.

In mid-2020, mu Space sent an extra enormous payload cooperating with TOT Public Company Limited which incorporates a wide scope of electronic devices, and sensors for the estimation. Apart from that, the company also coordinated with a group of scientists, biologists, young students and famous Thai artists to send anti-disciplinary experiments for studying the effect of weightlessness and understanding of DNA Storage Preservation.

5G Services 
mu Space provides a solution of 5G services for mobile vendors and operators including 5G infrastructure (antenna and network equipment), 5G end devices (robot user terminal and machines), software for specific use cases (field measurement and signal analyzer), and installation (Base Station and EDGE Computing).

Other Collaborations

Tham Luang cave rescue 

mu Space assembled a team of engineers to help in the rescue mission to save the 12 boys and their football coach trapped inside Tham Luang cave in Thailand. The company collaborated with Google and Weather Decision Technologies to provide the rescuers with weather forecast models.

See also 

 CAT Telecom
 True Corporation
 SES S.A.
 Blue Origin

References

External links
mu Space Corp website

Internet service providers of Thailand
Communications satellite operators
Technology companies established in 2017
Thai companies established in 2017
Companies based in Bangkok
Telecommunications companies of Thailand
Space tourism